The ACE file format is a specification for storing data about genomic contigs. 

The original ACE format was developed for use with Consed, a
program for viewing, editing, and finishing DNA sequence assemblies.  

ACE files are generated by various assembly programs, including
Phrap, CAP3, Newbler, Arachne, AMOS (more specifically Minimo) and Tigr Assembler v2.

External links
 ACE format specification
 BioPerl IO module for ACE
 Contig representation in several assembly formats

Computer file formats